Lu Xiaosha (born 1973), also known as Sarah Lu, is a Chinese chess player who holds the FIDE title of Woman International Master (WIM, 1995).

Biography
In 1995, Lu participated in Women's World Chess Championship Interzonal Tournament in Chişinău where ranked 25th place. In 1995, she was awarded the FIDE Woman International Master (WIM) title.

Later Lu moved to United States. In 2001, she won the Hawaii State Chess Championship. Lu is currently living in California, where she operates a chess school (Beyond Chess) alongside her husband Ben Deng.

References

External links
 
 
 
 

1973 births
Living people
Chinese female chess players
Chess Woman International Masters